Abnak Records was a record label based in Dallas, Texas, owned by Fort Worth insurance man John Howard Abdnor Sr., active from 1963 to 1971, begun mainly as an outlet for his son John H. Abdnor Jr., primarily as Jon & Robin.  The most success for the label came from the group The Five Americans.  Subsidiary labels were Startime Records, Jetstar Records, and Britannia Records.  Their final album was distributed by Uni Records and was by Michael Rabon & Chocktaw, released in 1971, which featured members of The Five Americans.

Sundazed Records owns the Abnak catalogue today.

References

External links
Radio London - Field's Fab Forty - 4 June 1967
 Abnak discography from BSN Pubs

American record labels
Companies based in Dallas
Defunct record labels of the United States
Record labels established in 1963
Record labels disestablished in 1971